Rejuvenation is the tenth studio album by American rapper Juvenile. It was released on June 19, 2012, by UTP Records, Young Empire and Fontana Distribution.

Singles 
The album's first single, titled "Power" featuring Rick Ross, was released on December 6, 2011.

Track listing

Charts

References 

2012 albums
Juvenile (rapper) albums
Albums produced by Mannie Fresh
Albums produced by Drumma Boy
Rap-A-Lot Records albums

pl:Beast Mode